Kingsgate is a port of entry in southeastern British Columbia, just north of the Canada–US border at Eastport, Idaho. It is the site of the Eastport-Kingsgate Border Crossing.

Kingsgate is on the Columbia Highway, BC 95, the north–south highway in the southeastern corner of the province, opened in 1957.  The highway connects with U.S. Route 95, from which the highway takes its number.

Canada–United States border crossings
U.S. Route 95
Populated places in the Regional District of Central Kootenay